The 1999 season was the Hawthorn Football Club's 75th season in the Australian Football League and 98th overall.

Fixture

Premiership season

Ladder

References

Hawthorn Football Club seasons